Genk Body & Assembly was a Ford Motor Company automobile factory in Genk, Belgium, just over an hour to the west of the company's European head office in Cologne, Germany. The site spanned . The plant employed approx 4,300 workers in 2014.

The plant opened in the early 1960s. The first mainstream car built there was Ford's first front wheel drive volume model, the Ford Taunus P4. Later on the plant focused on producing mid-sized family cars including the company's Sierra and Mondeo models.

Models built

Closure
Ford announced in October 2012 that it was planning to close its Genk plant at the end of 2014 in response to longstanding over-capacity problems in Europe, as part of a larger closure plan that will see the manufacturer's European capacity slashed by 20%, with further capacity cuts penciled in should the company not succeed in returning to higher European sales volumes.  The next generation of Ford Mondeo will be assembled, for the European market, at the manufacturer's Valencia plant.

Reports in March 2013 indicated that agreement with the workers' representatives would see Ford paying out an average of €144,000 (at the time equivalent to US$187,500) for each of the 4,000 workers to be laid off. It was noted that this was significantly below the US$202,700 per worker that had been the price reportedly paid by General Motors at the closure in 2010 of their Antwerp facility.

At the end of 2016 it was estimated that the decontamination of the site would cost 11.4 million euros.

See also
List of Ford factories

References

Ford of Europe factories
Motor vehicle assembly plants in Belgium
Genk
2014 disestablishments in Belgium
Buildings and structures in Limburg (Belgium)
1964 establishments in Belgium
Former motor vehicle assembly plants